Elkhorn Creek is a stream in Wayne County, Indiana and Preble County, Ohio, in the United States. It is a tributary of the East Fork Whitewater River.

Elkhorn Creek was so named because it was thought its course resembled antlers.

See also
List of rivers of Indiana
List of rivers of Ohio

References

Rivers of Preble County, Ohio
Rivers of Wayne County, Indiana
Rivers of Indiana
Rivers of Ohio